Linda Stenlund (born 30 October 2000) is a Swedish female curler. In 2022, she won a silver medal at the 2022 World Junior Curling Championships as alternate for the Moa Dryburgh rink.

She is a 2019 Swedish mixed curling champion and played at the 2019 World Mixed Curling Championship.

Teams

Women's

Mixed

References

External links
 
 Stenlund, Linda | Nordic Junior Curling Tour
 Om Team Norrlander | ÖCK Team Norrlander 
 
 

Living people
Swedish female curlers
Swedish curling champions
2000 births
Place of birth missing (living people)